Lin Zexu (30 August 1785 – 22 November 1850), courtesy name Yuanfu, was a Chinese political philosopher and politician. He was the head of states (Viceroy), Governor General, scholar-official, and under the Daoguang Emperor of the Qing dynasty best known for his role in the First Opium War of 1839–42. He was from Fuzhou, Fujian Province. Lin's forceful opposition to the opium trade was a primary catalyst for the First Opium War. He is praised for his constant position on the "moral high ground" in his fight, but he is also blamed for a rigid approach which failed to account for the domestic and international complexities of the problem. The Emperor endorsed the hardline policies and anti-drugs movement advocated by Lin, but placed all responsibility for the resulting disastrous Opium War onto Lin.

Early life and career
Lin was born in Houguan (侯官; modern Fuzhou, Fujian Province) towards the end of the Qianlong Emperor's reign. His father, Lin Binri, served as an official under the Qing government. He was the second son in the family. As a child, he was already "unusually brilliant". In 1811, he obtained the position of advanced Jinshi in the imperial examination, and in the same year he gained admission to the Hanlin Academy. He rose rapidly through various grades of provincial service. He opposed the opening of China but felt the need of a better knowledge of foreigners, which drove him to collect material for a geography of the world. He later gave this material to Wei Yuan, who published the Illustrated Treatise on the Maritime Kingdoms in 1843. He became Governor-General of Hunan and Hubei in 1837, where he launched a suppression campaign against the trading of opium.

Campaign to suppress opium

Soon after his arrival in Guangdong in the middle of 1839, Lin wrote a memorial to the "Ruler of England" in the form of an open letter published in Canton, urging England to end the opium trade. He argued that China was providing Britain with valuable commodities such as tea, porcelain, spices and silk, with Britain sending only "poison" in return. He accused the foreigner traders of coveting profit and lacking morality. His memorial expressed a desire that the ruler would act "in accordance with decent feeling" and support his efforts. Since he believed that opium was banned in the United Kingdom, he thought it was wrong for Queen Victoria to support it in China. He wrote:

The letter elicited no response (sources suggest that it was lost in transit), but it was later reprinted in the London Times as a direct appeal to the British public.

An edict from the Daoguang Emperor followed on 18March, emphasising the serious penalties for opium smuggling that would now apply.

In March 1839, Lin started to take measures that would eliminate the opium trade. He was a formidable bureaucrat known for his competence and high moral standards, with an imperial commission from the Daoguang Emperor to halt the illegal importation of opium by the British. He made changes within a matter of months. He arrested more than 1,700 Chinese opium dealers and confiscated over 70,000 opium pipes. He initially attempted to get foreign companies to forfeit their opium stores in exchange for tea, but this ultimately failed. Lin resorted to using force in the western merchants' enclave. A month and a half later, the merchants gave up nearly 1.2 million kg (2.6 million pounds) of opium. Beginning 3 June 1839, 500 workers laboured for 23 days to destroy it, mixing the opium with lime and salt and throwing it into the sea outside of Humen Town. Lin composed an elegy apologising to the gods of the sea for polluting their realm.

Lin and the Daoguang Emperor, comments historian Jonathan Spence, "seemed to have believed that the citizens of Canton and the foreign traders there had simple, childlike natures that would respond to firm guidance and statements of moral principles set out in simple, clear terms." Neither Lin nor the emperor appreciated the depth or changed nature of the problem. They did not see the change in international trade structures, the commitment of the British government to protecting the interests of private traders, and the peril to British traders who would surrender their opium.

Open hostilities between China and Britain started in 1839 in what later would be called the "First Opium War". The immediate effect was that both sides, by the words of Charles Elliot and Lin, banned all trade. Before this, Lin had pressured the Portuguese government of Macau, so the British found themselves without refuge, except for the bare and rocky harbours of Hong Kong. Soon, however, the Chinese forces faced a British naval fleet, which included the East India Company's steam warship Nemesis and improved weapons, and were soon routed.

Exile in Xinjiang

Lin made significant preparations for war against the possible British invasion. The British sailed north to attack Jiangsu and Zhejiang. The governors of these two provinces failed to heed a warning from Lin, however, and were unprepared when the British easily landed and occupied Dinghai.

Lin became a scapegoat for these losses due to court politics. As punishment, he was exiled to the remote Ili region in Xinjiang. His position was then given to Qishan in September 1840.

While in Xinjiang, Lin was the first Chinese scholar to record several aspects of Muslim culture there. In 1850, he noted in a poem that the Muslims in Ili did not worship idols but bowed and prayed to tombs decorated with poles that had the tails of cows and horses attached to them. This was the widespread shamanic practice of erecting a tugh, but this was its first recorded appearance in Chinese writings. He also recorded several Kazakh oral tales, such as one concerning a green goat spirit of the lake whose appearance is a harbinger of hail or rain.

The Qing government ultimately rehabilitated Lin. In 1845, he was appointed Governor-General of Shaan-Gan (Shaanxi-Gansu). In 1847, he became governor-General of Yun-Gui (Yunnan-Guizhou). These posts were less prestigious than his previous position in Canton, thus his career never fully recovered from the failures there.

Death and legacy

Lin died in 1850 while on the way to Guangxi Province, where the Qing government was sending him to help put down the Taiping Rebellion. Though he was originally blamed for causing the First Opium War, Lin's reputation was rehabilitated in the last years of the Qing dynasty, as efforts were made once more to eradicate opium production and trade. He became a symbol of the fight against opium, with his image displayed in parades, and his writings quoted approvingly by anti-opium and anti-drugs reformers.

Despite the antagonism between the Chinese and the British at the time, the English sinologist Herbert Giles praised and admired Lin: "He was a fine scholar, a just and merciful official and a true patriot."

Lin's former home, situated in Fuzhou's historic Sanfang-Qixiang ("Three Lanes and Seven Alleys") district, is open to the public.  Inside, his work as a government official, including the opium trade and other work where he improved agricultural methods, championed water conservation (including his work to save Fuzhou's West Lake from becoming a rice field) and his campaign against corruption are well documented.

In China, Lin is popularly viewed as a national hero. June 3—the day when Lin confiscated the chests of opium—is unofficially celebrated as Opium Suppression Movement Day in Taiwan, whereas June 26 is recognized as the International Day against Drug Abuse and Illicit Trafficking in honour of Lin's work.
Monuments to Lin have been constructed in Chinese communities around the world. A statue of Lin stands in Chatham Square in Chinatown, New York City, United States. The base of the statue is inscribed with "Pioneer in the war against drugs" in English and Chinese. A wax statue of Lin also appeared in Madame Tussauds wax museum in London.

More recently, Lin has appeared as a character in River of Smoke, the second novel in the Ibis trilogy by Amitav Ghosh, which takes the Opium Wars as its setting to shed new light on a much-repressed history while offering a contemporary critique of globalisation. The novel takes place in 1838–1839, during which time Lin arrived in Canton and tensions escalated between the foreigners and the Chinese officials.

Three films have been made on his role in the Opium Wars such that he is now one of the symbols of modern China's resistance to European imperialism.

His grandson Commodore Lin Taizeng was an officer in the Beiyang Fleet and commanded one of China's two modern battleships purchased from Germany in the 1880s, Zhenyuan, during the First Sino-Japanese War (1894–1895). He committed suicide with an opium overdose after the ship ran aground and had to be abandoned. 

Lin descendants are living in Fuzhou, Fujian and surroundings, Jieyang (Puning), Meizhou, Guangdong and surroundings, various places in China and United States.

Lin is also remembered for a couplet he wrote after his exile which reflects his stoic acceptance: "海納百川，有容乃大。壁立千仞，無欲則剛。" ("The sea accepts the waters of a hundred rivers; its tolerance results in its grandeur.  The cliff towers to a height of a thousand ren [unit of length roughly equal to a fathom]; its lack of desire gives it its resilience.")  The first line of the couplet was chosen as the motto for Chinese Wikipedia.

See also

 History of opium in China
 International Day against Drug Abuse and Illicit Trafficking
 7145 Linzexu
 Prohibition (drugs)

References

Citations

Bibliography

Further reading

External links

 Text of Lin's Letter to Queen Victoria (Alt)
Contemporary translation of the letter in The Chinese Repository volume 8, number 1, p. 9, published in May 1839: available at HathiTrust and at the Internet Archive
an image of the original letter is also available
 Lin Zexu Memorial
 
 "Lin Zexu" Encyclopædia Britannica Online

1785 births
1850 deaths
19th-century Chinese philosophers
Chinese political philosophers
Qing dynasty politicians from Fujian
People of the First Opium War
Political office-holders in Gansu
Political office-holders in Guangdong
Political office-holders in Hubei
Political office-holders in Yunnan
Politicians from Fuzhou
Viceroys of Huguang
Viceroys of Liangguang
Viceroys of Shaan-Gan
Viceroys of Yun-Gui